The 2016 IHF Super Globe was the tenth edition of the tournament. It was held in Doha (Qatar) at the Duhail Handball Sports Hall from 5 to 8 September 2016.

Berlin defeated Paris in the final to gain their second title.

Teams
Eight teams participated.

Referees
The following pairs of referees were selected for the championship.

Results
All times are local (UTC+3).

Bracket

5th place bracket

Quarterfinals

5–8th place semifinals

Semifinals

Seventh place game

Fifth place game

Third place game

Final

Final ranking

References

External links
Official website

IHF Super Globe
2016
IHF Super Globe
2016 IHF Super Globe
2016 IHF Super Globe
IHF Super Globe